Wu Ho-ching (born 30 August 1991) is a Hong Kong-based tennis player.

Career
On 2 March 2020, she reached her best singles ranking of world No. 536.

Wu made her WTA Tour debut at the 2014 Hong Kong Tennis Open, having received a wildcard with Venise Chan in the doubles tournament, but lost to Karolína and Kristýna Plíšková in the first round.

Playing for Hong Kong Fed Cup team, Wu has a win–loss record of 20–16 in Fed Cup competition and has played in 33 ties, being the second most Hong Kong Player behind Zhang Ling.

ITF Circuit finals

Singles: 5 (2 titles, 3 runner-up)

Doubles: 5 (2 title, 3 runner-ups)

Fed Cup participation

Singles (3–0)

Doubles (6–5)

References

External links
 
 
 

1991 births
Living people
Hong Kong female tennis players
Tennis players at the 2014 Asian Games
Tennis players at the 2018 Asian Games
Asian Games competitors for Hong Kong